Botryococcus is a genus of green algae. The cells form an irregularly shaped aggregate. Thin filaments connect the cells. The cell body is ovoid, 6 to 10 μm long, and 3 to 6 μm wide. Fossils of the genus are known since Precambrian times, and form the single largest biological contributor to crude oil, and are a major component of oil shales.

Description
Appears as colonies of cells irregularly arranges cells in a folded mucilage. Cells spherical or oval, chloroplast net-like with a single pyrenoid.

The most prominent member is Botryococcus braunii.

Other species:
B. protubens West et G.S.West.

References

Trebouxiophyceae genera
Trebouxiophyceae
Trebouxiales
Taxa named by Friedrich Traugott Kützing